The A.M. Isayev Chemical Engineering Design Bureau, also known as KB KhimMash or just KBKhM, is a Russian rocket engine design and manufacturing company. It is located in the city of Korolyov. It started as the OKB-2 division of the NII-88 research institute, where A.Isaev directed the development of liquid rocket engines for ballistic missile submarines.

Products

Current engines
Engines in current production:
Monopropellant Thrusters
DOT-5
DOT-25
MLC-10
MLC-50
Bipropellant Thrusters
S5.142 (DST-25)
DST-50
DST-100
DST-100A
DST-200
DST-200A
DMT-6
DMT-500
DMT-600
DMT-1000
DMT-2200
Main propulsion
S5.80
S5.92
S5.98
KVD-1
Propulsion Modules
KTDU-80
Experimental Engines
С5.86.1000-0

Former engines
Engines that are no longer produced.

Monopropellant Thrusters
S5.70: Used on Phobos 1 spacecraft.
S5.70: Used on Phobos 1 spacecraft.
Bipropellant Thrusters
S5.144: Used on the control module 17D61 of the Ikar.
S5.205
Orbit Correction Engines
S5.4: Liquid engine burning TG-02 and AK20F in the gas generator cycle. Used to deorbit Vostok, Voskhod and Zenit.
S5.35: Backup engine of the KTDU-35.
S5.53: Orbital correction engine for the lunar version of the Soyuz.
S5.60: Main engine of the KTDU-35.
S5.66: Maneuvering engine version for the Salyut 1 and Salyut 4 stations. Also was composed of primary and secondary engines.
S5.79: Pressure-fed rocket engine burning N2O4/UDMH. Used as the main orbital engine of Salyut-6, Salyut-7, Mir Core Module and Zvezda.
Propulsion Modules
KDU-414: Pressure-fed liquid rocket engine burning UDMH and RFNA. Used on early soviet deep space probes.
KTDU-35: Liquid rocket engine burning UDMH and AK27I in the gas generator cycle. Used on first generation Soyuz, and Progress.
KTDU-426: Spacecraft version of the S5.79. Used on the Soyuz-T.
Military Missiles
RD-1
RD-1M
Y-1250
U-400-10
PT 45-2
SU-1500
Y-2000
S09.19A?
S09.29A S09.29.0-0
S09.29D
S09.29B
S09.29.0-OV?
S09.29.0-OV?
S2.145
S2.145
S2.168A
S2.168B
S2.219
S.911.0100 S2.219?
S2.244
S2.258
S2.260
S2.268
S2.514
S2.711
S2.711V S2.711V1
S2.720
S2.720.A2
S2.720M
S2.721 S2.721V
S2.722
S2.722V
S2.726
S2.727
S2.751V?
S2.1100: A TG-02/AK20K burning engine. Development years: 1955–1958. For use in the booster module of the Burya intercontinental cruise missile project.
S2.1150: An improved version of the S2.1100. Development years: 1958–1960. For use in the booster module of the Burya project.
S2.1200
C5.1
S.5.6.0000.0
S5.15
C5.33
C5.33A C5.33M
S5.41
S5.44 5D25
S5.57
S5.44 5D25
5D25N
C5.83
Rocket engines for ICBM and SLBM
S2.253 (8D511): A kerosene/AK20 burning engine in the pressure fed cycle. Development years: 1951-1955 . For use in first versions of Scud-A. Ignition by hypergolic start fuel TG-02.
S2.253A: A kerosene/AK-20  burning engine in the pressure fed cycle. Development years: 1953-1959 . For use in the RSM-11FM. Ignition by hypergolic start fuel TG-02.
S2.713: A TG-02/AK27I burning engine in the gas generator cycle. Development years: 1956-1961 . For use in the R-13. It included a fixed nozzle and four verniers.
S5.2 (9D21): A TM-185/AK-27I  burning engine in the gas generator cycle. Development years: 1959-1962 . For use in the R-17.
C5.3: A TG-02/AK-27I burning engine in the gas generator cycle. Development years: 1958-1963 . For use in the R-21.
S5.3M: A TG-02/AK-27I burning engine in the gas generator cycle. Development years: 1960. Project for the ICBM R-9B.
4D-10: A UDMH/N2O4 burning engine in the staged combustion cycle. Development years: 1962-1968 . For use as main engine of the first stage of R-27. First engine submerged in the propellant tank.
4D-10: A UDMH/N2O4 burning engine in the gas generator cycle. Development years: 1963-1968 . For use as the steering engine of the first stage of the R-27. Submerged in the propellant tank.
4D-76: A UDMH/N2O4 burning engine in the gas generator cycle. Development years: 1964-1971 . For use as main engine of the second stage of R-29. Submerged in the propellant tank.
4D-76M: A UDMH/N2O4 burning engine in the gas generator cycle. Development years: 1969-1970 . Improved version of the 4D-76.
4D-28: A UDMH/N2O4 burning engine in the gas generator cycle. Development years: 1968-1970 . For use on the second stage of the rocket RSM-27K.
3D-20: A UDMH/N2O4 burning engine in the staged combustion cycle. Development years: 1971-1973 . For use as main engine RSM-27U.
3D-20: A UDMH/N2O4 burning engine in the gas generator cycle. Development years: 1971-1973 . For use as steering engine R-27U.
3D-41: A UDMH/N2O4 burning engine in the gas generator cycle. Development years: 1973-1975 . For use on the second stage of R-29R. Submerged in the propellant tank.
3D-42: A UDMH/N2O4 burning engine in the gas generator cycle. Development years: 1973-1975 . For use on warhead of the  R-29R . Four fixed main combustion chambers and four verniers.
3D-67?: A UDMH/N2O4 burning engine in the gas generator cycle. Development years: 1976-1980 . For use on warhead of the R-39. Dual-mode rocket engine with multiple regimen.
3D-36: A UDMH/N2O4 burning engine in the gas generator cycle. Development years: 1980-1986 . For use on warhead of the R-29RM.
ZD-38: A UDMH/N2O4 burning engine in the staged combustion cycle. Development years: 1980-1986 . For use on the second stage R-29RM. Submerged in the propellant tank.
3D-39: A UDMH/N2O4 burning engine in the staged combustion cycle. Development years: 1980-1986 . For use on the third stage R-29RM. Submerged in the propellant tank.

See also

Isayev — Founder and director of the company until 1975.
NII-88 — The research institute where KB KhimMash started as OKB-2 division.
Khrunichev State Research and Production Space Center — The corporate parent of KBKhM.
United Rocket and Space Corporation — The government owned corporate entity that will encompass all aerospace corporations in Russia.

References

External links
 KBKhM Official Page

Rocket engine manufacturers of Russia
Aerospace companies of the Soviet Union
Khrunichev Center
Companies based in Moscow Oblast
 
Design bureaus
Research institutes in the Soviet Union